The Nylon Curtain is the eighth studio album by American singer-songwriter Billy Joel, released on September 23, 1982, and produced by Phil Ramone.

Background
The album is among Joel's most ambitious efforts, and Joel has openly acknowledged that it is one of his personal favorites, calling it "the recording I'm most proud of and the material I'm most proud of." When he recorded the album, he said in an interview that he wanted to "create a sonic masterpiece." Joel spent more time in the studio, crafting the sound of the album, than he had on any previous album. He said that the process of making the album was "exhausting." Critics have interpreted the album to be, in part, an homage to the music of The Beatles and the then-recently deceased John Lennon.

Saxophonist/multi-instrumentalist Richie Cannata left the band prior to recording, so Joel, bassist Doug Stegmeyer, drummer Liberty DeVitto and guitarists David Brown and Russell Javors recorded the album mostly by themselves, thus making it Joel's first album since Streetlife Serenade not to feature a regular saxophonist, although Eddie Daniels plays saxophone on the closing track "Where's the Orchestra?" alongside Charles McCracken on cello and Dominic Cortese on accordion. Saxophonist/multi-instrumentalist Mark Rivera, formerly of the band Tycoon, joined the band to replace Cannata for the Nylon Curtain Tour and he remains with the band to this day.

Regarding the album's themes, Joel has stated "It was during the Reagan years, and the diminishing horizons in America at the time [meant that] all of a sudden you weren't going to be able to inherit [the kind of life] your old man had." This pessimism about the American dream, in Joel's view, permeates most of the songs on the album. Joel also said that the theme of the album was "an American dilemma, specifically of people born after World War II." He said that although he doesn't provide solutions to the dilemma, he "hope[d] the record speaks like someone in that age group, if only just to tie us all together as people, as an entity."

The song "Allentown," which brought attention to the plight of America's declining steel industry, spent an unprecedented six weeks at No. 17 on the Billboard Hot 100 in early 1983.

Pop-culture journalist Chuck Klosterman praised songs from the album, specifically "Laura" and "Where's the Orchestra?", in his book Sex, Drugs, and Cocoa Puffs.

Production
Joel stated in an interview that most of the songs on the album were written in the same sequence in which they appear on the album. The album's production schedule was slightly thrown off near the end of production due to Joel himself getting into a motorcycle accident.

The album opens with "Allentown", which despite the name is actually about the nearby town of Bethlehem, Pennsylvania. Bethlehem, largely based in the production of steel for automobiles, was experiencing economic difficulties in the midst of the early 1980s recession which impacted the steel industry. Joel wrote the melody for "Allentown" eight years before finishing it, later completing the lyrics in time for inclusion on The Nylon Curtain. According to Joel, the titular character from the song "Laura" was supposed to represent anyone who knows how to "push your buttons" and make you feel guilty. He also explained that the character, despite having the female-oriented name "Laura", could represent anybody, regardless of sex. "Pressure" is about reaching a certain age and realizing the real-life responsibilities one has to deal with. The song was recorded with eight different overdubbed synthesizer tracks, as well as a segment with four people playing the mandolin. The closing song to Side A, "Goodnight Saigon", is about American soldiers fighting in the Vietnam War, and was written by Joel at the request of his veteran peers who fought during the war. Joel wanted to avoid creating a political song that took sides, instead opting to describe things entirely from the soldiers' point-of-view in the midst of the action. Although Joel never fought as a soldier in Vietnam (Joel explained in an interview that he was a draft dodger during the time of the war), he had several peers at the time who did, some of whom never returned, and received input from many of his friends who had served in the army in order to accurately depict what it was like being stationed in Vietnam. The song opens and closes with the sound of the rotors spinning on a Bell UH-1 Iroquois (or "Huey"), a military helicopter which was heavily used during the Vietnam War.

The B-side of The Nylon Curtain opens with "She's Right On Time", an uplifting love song, to contrast with the more serious tone of the preceding "Goodnight Saigon." The song details the anticipated reunion between two lovers, told from the point-of-view of the man in the relationship waiting for the woman to arrive. Since the song was written by Joel around Christmas time, the preparation of a Christmas tree was used as an analogy throughout the song. "A Room Of Our Own" thematically opposes "She's Right On Time", detailing a couple who needs time away from each other; the song lays out numerous differences between the two. The song "Surprises", described by Joel as a "grand metaphysical statement", is about how one shouldn't be surprised by their inability to control things, though the song is open to several different interpretations according to Joel. The first three songs on side B all display a relationship theme. “She’s Right On Time” describing the reunion, “A Room Of Our Own” describing the decline as the lovers drift apart, and “Surprises” with the inevitable separation.   "Scandinavian Skies", which prominently features string parts inspired by the songs "I Am The Walrus" and "Strawberry Fields Forever" by The Beatles, was inspired by a horrifying drug experience Joel went through during a flight trip. The closing song, "Where's The Orchestra?", is about a man who goes to see a live play expecting a musical, only to realize that it's a regular stage show; according to Joel, this is a metaphor for life, specifically the realization that it's not as grand and over-the-top as it is sometimes made out to be. Joel tried to make the song feel reminiscent of musical plays. In the studio recording, Joel's vocals play from the left speaker channel, whereas the orchestral backing is in the right speaker channel, to emulate a man sitting in a theater seat and watching a play. The song closes by reprising the melody of "Allentown", thus bringing the album full-circle.

Accolades

Grammy Awards 

|-
| width="35" align="center"|1983 || The Nylon Curtain || Album of the Year || 
|-

Track listing
All tracks written and composed by Billy Joel.

Side one
"Allentown" – 3:52
"Laura" – 5:05
"Pressure" – 4:40
"Goodnight Saigon" – 7:04

Side two
"She's Right on Time" – 4:14
"A Room of Our Own" – 4:04
"Surprises" – 3:26
"Scandinavian Skies" – 6:00
"Where's the Orchestra?" – 3:17

Personnel
Musicians
 Billy Joel – vocals, acoustic and electric pianos, synthesizers, Hammond organ, melodica, Prophet-5 synthesizer, Synclavier II (3)
 David Brown –  electric and acoustic guitars (lead)
 Russell Javors – electric and acoustic guitars (rhythm)
 Doug Stegmeyer – bass guitar
 Liberty DeVitto – drums, percussion

Additional musicians
 Bill Zampino – field snare (4)
 Rob Mounsey – synthesizer (8)
 Dominic Cortese – accordion (9)
 Eddie Daniels – saxophone and clarinet (9)
 Charles McCracken – cello (9)
 Dave Grusin – string and horn arrangements
 David Nadien – concertmaster (1, 3–7, 9)
 "String Fever" – strings (2, 8)

Production
 Phil Ramone – producer
 Laura Loncteaux – assistant producer
 Jim Boyer –  engineer, remix
 Bradshaw Leigh – associate engineer
 Michael Christopher – assistant engineer
 Larry Franke – assistant engineer
 Andy Hoffman – assistant engineer
 Ted Jensen at Sterling Sound, NYC – mastering engineer
 Kenneth Topolsky – production manager
 Paula Scher – artwork
 John Berg – inner sleeve design
 Chris Austopchuk – front cover design
 Benno Friedman – back cover photo

Charts

Weekly charts

Year-end charts

Certifications and sales

References

1982 albums
Billy Joel albums
Albums produced by Phil Ramone
Columbia Records albums